Stephen Uppal (born 1978) is an English actor of Indian descent from Ormesby in Middlesbrough. He is known for playing Ravi Roy in the long-running British soap Hollyoaks, Zaf in the 2009 film Freight, and also for playing characters in The History Boys at Wyndham's Theatre.

Uppal gained a qualification in English at the University of Teesside before winning a place at Arts Educational School where he performed many roles which included Arthur in Peggy Sue Got Married, Smike in Nicholas Nickleby and Neville in The Mystery of Edwin Drood.

Filmography

Television

Film

Stage credits
My Beautiful Launderette (Salim), Duchess Theatre (Workshop)
The History Boys (Cover Rudge/Timms), Wyndham's Theatre
The History Boys (Cover Rudge/Timms), Royal National Theatre
Tonight's the Night (Company), No 1 UK Tour

References

External links

1978 births
Living people
English male actors of South Asian descent
English Sikhs
English people of Indian descent
English people of Punjabi descent
English male soap opera actors
English male stage actors
Actors from Middlesbrough
Alumni of Teesside University